Uno Kaskpeit (born 8 June 1957 in Valga) is an Estonian politician. He has been a member of the XIII Riigikogu and XIV Riigikogu.

In 2000 he graduated from Estonian Academy of Security Sciences in border guard. In 2006 Kaskpeidi Unn graduated from Tallinn University in organisational behaviour.

Since 2015 he is a member of Conservative People's Party of Estonia.

References

1957 births
Conservative People's Party of Estonia politicians
Living people
Members of the Riigikogu, 2015–2019
Members of the Riigikogu, 2019–2023
People from Valga, Estonia
Tallinn University alumni